Exodus is a 2015 Georgian short drama film directed by Vakhtang Jajanidze. It was screened in the Tbilisi International Film Festival, where it won Jury special prize.

Plot

Cast
 Tatiana Bitsadze
 Lili Bitsadze

Festival awards /selection 
Tbilisi Film Festival, Georgia, 2015 – Special Jury Prize
Maine International Film Festival, USA, 2016
Filmfest Dresden: International Short Film Festival, Germany, 2017

References

External links
 

2015 films
2015 drama films
2010s Georgian-language films
Drama films from Georgia (country)